Alex Mandon Rey (born 10 July 2005), known by the stage name Alextopdancer, is a Spanish entertainer. He was one of four finalist on the Spanish TV show (RTVE) "The Dancer" in 2021. In April 2021, representing Spain, he became the 18th member of global pop group Now United.

References

2005 births
Living people
People from Mallorca
Spanish dancers